The online video game and game creation system Roblox has numerous games (officially referred to as "experiences") created by users of their creation tool, Roblox Studio. Due to Robloxs popularity, various games created on the site have grown increasing attention in popularity and received media coverage as the result; some of the games have millions of active players monthly, about 5,000 games having over a million visits and a few having over a billion.

Original games

Adopt Me!

Adopt Me! is a massively multiplayer online role-playing game where the nominal focus is players pretending to be either parents adopting a child, or children getting adopted, though the de facto focus is around adopting and caring for many different pets, who can be traded with other players. As of October 2022, the game had been played upwards of thirty billion times. Adopt Me! was averaging 600,000 concurrent players as of June 2020, making it the most popular game on Roblox. Due to the high cost of pets within the game, with some rare pets selling for up to US$100, a large number of scammers have risen up within the game. As the primary user base of Adopt Me! is on average younger than the rest of Roblox, they are especially susceptible to falling for scams. Uplift Games, the studio behind the game, has accumulated over $16 million in revenue, mostly from microtransactions. The game won three awards in the 2020 Bloxy Awards.

BedWars 
BedWars is a player versus player combat game based on the Minecraft minigame of the same name. Players must defend their beds in order to be able to respawn and break other people's beds so they can eliminate them with a final kill. Players can also equip kits to help them beat the game easily, with their own unique weapon and even drawbacks as well.

Break In
Break In is a horror game developed by New Zealand university student Alec Kieft. The story focuses around a group of players who are trapped inside a house that is being besieged by a gang. Break In is considered to be part of a genre of Roblox games deemed "story games", which was popularised by the earlier games in the Camping series. The game's popularity is attributed by Kieft to it being covered by several large YouTubers.

Brookhaven RP

Brookhaven RP (also known as Brookhaven) is a role-playing game where players can role-play with other users. The game was cited as a key example of the roleplay genre that several prominent Roblox games are a part of. Brookhaven RP once had around 800,000 concurrent players at one time. The game was nominated for "Favorite Video Game" at the 2022 Kids' Choice Awards and 2023 Kids' Choice Awards.

Doors
Doors is a horror escape room game developed by indie game developers LSPLASH and Red, based on another Roblox game, Rooms. Players open doors and go through hotel rooms to progress through the game and escape. Creatures called "entities" either kill the player in various ways or help them. Players can display how they are progressing through the game by showing off one selected achievement and how many times they died. Doors was released on August 10, 2022. In November 2022, the game hit 1 billion visits, and on December, the game had a collaboration with Makeship for Screech plushies. A major update revamping the hotel was released on January 29, 2023 at 6 p.m. EST. Paintings can be spotted in most of the rooms, some referencing popular culture and sometimes YouTubers themselves. Some ideas made by fans either got into the game or cameo in the game. A nod to Rooms was added as part of the major update, featuring a revamped version of the game as a secret level.

Jailbreak

Jailbreak is a cops and robbers game which is among the most popular games on the site, accumulating tens of thousands of daily players, and which has been played a total of 6 billion times as of October 2022. Released in April 2017, Jailbreak was conceived and created as a more fleshed-out version of an earlier Roblox game called Prison Life.

Jailbreak was featured in Robloxs Ready Player One event, based around the release of the film. Alex Balfanz, a co-creator of Jailbreak, covered his undergraduate education at Duke University using funds from the game.

MeepCity
MeepCity is a massively multiplayer online role-playing game with noted similarities to Club Penguin and Toontown Online. In addition to its role-playing quantities, MeepCity also features customizable pets, called "Meeps". MeepCitys creator, Alex Binello, stated in 2018 that he was making enough money off the game to pay two employees and support his mother and brother. Binello is noted for his development techniques, which include playing the game on alternate accounts to gauge the reactions of new players. MeepCity was the first game on Roblox to pass 1 billion total visits. The game was averaging 100,000 concurrent players in July 2018. The game received a lot of criticism in early to late 2021 due to the number of e-daters inside the game and inappropriate clothing and actions found in the party feature. This caused the game to be placed as "under review" by Roblox on February 16, 2022, but the game got put back up a few hours later. At the same time, it was announced that parties were to be removed.

Murder Mystery 2
Murder Mystery 2 is a social deduction game where players are randomly assigned roles to play each round. One player is selected to be a murderer, who must kill everyone to win. Another player is selected to be a sheriff and must kill the murderer to win; all remaining players are selected as innocents whose goal is to survive. If the sheriff dies, the innocent can grab the sheriff’s gun and be a hero. The game's level design has been praised by critics.

Natural Disaster Survival
Natural Disaster Survival is a game where players are tasked with the role of surviving a litany of natural disasters thrown against them. The game has been positively compared to PlayerUnknown's Battlegrounds. Along with Work at a Pizza Place, Natural Disaster Survival is one of the oldest games on Roblox that still manages to maintain any degree of popularity, being created in 2008.

Phantom Forces
Phantom Forces is a first-person shooter game that has been positively compared to the Call of Duty, Battlefield, and Counter-Strike franchises. In the game, players can select weapons from four military types for each round they play. Additionally, players are able to perform various actions, such as the ability to crouch, lie in a prone position, flank, and jump to cover. Phantom Forces has received praise from critics for its design, controls, and complexity for a Roblox game. The game has also received three Bloxy Awards, and is one of the more popular games on the site, accumulating about 10,000 players daily.

Piggy
Piggy is an episodic horror game series that incorporates elements from Peppa Pig and the indie horror game Granny into a zombie apocalypse setting. The games' style of episodic storytelling resulted in a significant fandom developing prior to the game's finale on May 25, 2020. Piggy was uploaded to the site in January 2020 by Kohl Couture (also known as MiniToon) and had been played 11 billion times as of October 2022.

A sequel to Piggy, titled Piggy: Book 2, released on September 12, 2020. The last chapter was released on October 23, 2021. On November 24, 2022, MiniToon announced that the main game of Piggy was over.

The demo to another entry, Piggy: Intercity, was released on January 28. Piggy: Intercity is an open world survival game.

Rainbow Friends
Rainbow Friends is an episodic psychological survival horror game developed by Roy & Charcle, inspired by Poppy Playtime and Five Nights At Freddy's, in which players go through different areas collecting items to "help" a mad scientist known as Red, who kidnaps the players and tries to keep the them trapped in his facility. The game is composed of multiple nights, with the last nights being a "goodbye party". Hostile creatures called "the Rainbow Friends", known individually as Blue, Green, Orange, and Purple, kill the player if they capture you in some way. Players can hide from them with a box or hiding spots, or outrun/outwit some of them. Rainbow Friends was released on November 13, 2021. As of December 2022, Rainbow Friends has been played more than 1.1 billion times.

Royale High
Royale High (originally called Fairies and Mermaids Winx High School) is a massively multiplayer online role-playing game developed by Callmehbob. The game is set in a magical universe and deals with a fantasy school where players dress-up as royalty or supernatural creatures. Launched in 2017, Royale High had more than 8.2 billion total visits as of October 2022, regularly achieving thousands of concurrent players, making it one of the most popular games on the platform.

Tower of Hell 
Tower of Hell is a multiplayer obstacle course game where the player must get past a variety of obstacles to get to the top of the tower. Unlike traditional Roblox obstacle courses, there are no checkpoints. Tower of Hell has been played around 19.2 billion times as of October 2022. The game was nominated "Best Mobile Game" in the 7th annual Bloxy awards, however lost.

Welcome to Bloxburg
Welcome to Bloxburg is a game developed by Coeptus, and published by Coffee Stain Studios. The game is based on The Sims, and is noted for being a Roblox game in which players have to purchase 25 Robux before playing. As of October 2022, the game had been played 6.7 billion times. Welcome to Bloxburg was used as a demonstrative tool at a summer camp called the Junior Builder Camp in order to teach children about homebuilding.

Work at a Pizza Place
Work at a Pizza Place is a game in which players work together to fulfill orders at a pizza parlor. The game is considered a classic among the Roblox userbase, due to it being one of the oldest still-popular games on the platform, with the creator attributing its success to the game's ability to encourage socializing. The game has received praise for its driving mechanics. Work at a Pizza Place has been played over 4 billion times as of October 2022.

Licensed games
These games are based on an intellectual property separate from Roblox and have the owner's license to do so.

Duolingo Game Hub 
Duolingo Game Hub is a promotional game officially licensed and promoted by Duolingo. The game consists of a "Spanish or Vanish" maze where players have to collect items for the owl and an arcade full of fan-made games.

Hyundai Mobility Adventure 
Hyundai Mobility Adventure is a virtual space showcasing Hyundai Motor Company's vehicles and "future mobility solutions" . It was unveiled with the start of the open beta service on September 1, 2021, and the official service began on October 14, 2021. Hyundai Mobility Adventure allows the player to drive vehicles such as Hyundai Ioniq 5 and experience future mobility such as urban air mobility (UAM), purpose-built vehicles (PBV), and robotics.

Mechamato Robot Battle 
Mechamato Robot Battle is a game based on Mechamato animation series and set in the BoBoiBoy universe and developed by Monsta Game. It is an adventure game released on 15 October 2022 where player can level up by eliminating the legion of bad robots and collect coins by exploring the Kota Hilir town.

Sonic Speed Simulator 
Sonic Speed Simulator is a game set in the Sonic the Hedgehog universe and developed by Gamefam Studios. It is an incremental game with the player requiring to level up to run faster. The game is officially backed and licensed by Sega. The game was initially launched on April 13, 2022 as a paid beta game, costing 50 Robux to access, and officially released as free-to-play 3 days later. Alan Wen's review on Eurogamer praised the 3D, open-world gameplay, but criticized the progression, obstacle courses, and race minigame, finding the progression to be unsatisfying and race minigame as too basic and lag-inducing.

NERF Strike
NERF Strike is a Nerf-themed video game developed and published by Metaverse Team for the Roblox game platform, and officially licensed by Hasbro. It is a first-person shooter in which the player, selecting from a variety of armor, virtual blasters resembling the series's line of toy guns, and secondary arsenal, can select 3 different game modes: Domination, Team Match, and Free-For-All. Domination is a game mode in which the player has to guard and capture team flags to rack up points, with the team with the most points being the winner. Free-For-All is a game mode in which the player hunts down other players, with the player with the most tags being the winner. Team Match is similar to Free-For-All, except one team has to gain more points than the other by tagging members of the opposing team. In each mode, the player must score tags by shooting players with darts, causing the tagged players to respawn elsewhere. Besides the game modes, the game also has anti-cheat mechanics that allow players to focus on their match instead of getting distracted by a cheater.

Unlicensed games
These games, while based on an intellectual property separate from Roblox, are not licensed by the owner to do so.

Pokémon Brick Bronze 

Pokémon Brick Bronze was a role-playing video game released in 2015 and developed by Llama Train Studio. It was not affiliated with the Pokémon media franchise. It was removed from the platform in April 2018 by Roblox administrators, reportedly after copyright concerns were raised by Nintendo. At its height, the game was regularly reaching tens of thousands of concurrent users. Pokémon Brick Bronze was one of many Pokémon games on Roblox, though it was widely considered the most extensive. The game's graphics were mostly a 3D block-style consistent with most games on Roblox, though the Pokémon were each represented by 3DS models in a pixel art style.

Pokémon Brick Bronze played much like a traditional Pokémon handheld game. At the beginning, players chose 1 out of 21 Starter Pokémon from numerous games. Brick Bronze featured combat similar to actual Pokémon games, with a turn-based battle system and NPC opponents that consisted of trainers and other traditional Pokémon enemies.

Luke Binns of Softonic gave a positive review of Brick Bronze, praising its expansiveness and declaring that "When playing Pokémon Brick Bronze, you may think you're playing the real thing". David Jagneaux, writing in PCMag, also spoke positively of the game, stating that it had "enough original ideas to occupy several days of your time". Steven Asarch, writing in Player-One, gave a negative review of the game, criticizing what he considered the "poor implementation of the battle system".

Funky Friday
Funky Friday is a game set in the Friday Night Funkin' universe and developed by Lyte Interactive and Gamefam Studios. It is an online rhythm game in which players can battle other players in a variety of songs and soundtrack lists. Likewise, the player can try on different outsets, preview and purchase morphs, speakers, emotes, and animations, and unlock new items through time-limited events.

Sonic Eclipse Online
Sonic Eclipse Online was a Sonic the Hedgehog fangame and developed by DoctorRofatnik, who has been accused of sexually preying on a child. The development team was also accused of being aware of the alleged abuse and making jokes about it. It was removed from the platform on December 27, 2021 per the request of Sega for copyright infringement.

References 

Roblox
Roblox